Shirshov may refer to:

People:
Aleksandr Shirshov (born 1972), Russian fencer
Anatoly Illarionovich Shirshov (1921–1981), Soviet mathematician
Nikolay Shirshov (born 1974), Uzbekistani football midfielder
Pyotr Shirshov (1905–1953), Russian Soviet oceanographer, hydrobiologist, polar explorer, statesman, academician, Hero of the Soviet Union (1938)

Geography:
Shirshov Ridge, on the eastern border of the Commander Basin below the Kamchatka Peninsula
Mount Shirshov, a small mountain 3 miles northeast of Mount Selwood in the Tula Mountains, Enderby Land
Shirshov Institute of Oceanology in Moscow, the largest institute for ocean and earth science research in Russia

See also
Lyndon-Shirshov basis or Free Lie algebra, a Lie algebra without any imposed relations